Ctenidia mordelloides is a species of beetle in the family Mordellidae, the only species in the genus Ctenidia.

References

Mordellidae
Beetles described in 1840